Matthías Vilhjálmsson (born 30 January 1987) is an Icelandic international footballer who plays as a striker for the Úrvalsdeild club FH. He can as well play as a midfielder. He also played for the Icelandic national football team from 2009 to 2016.

Matthías, also known as Matti Vill, has previously played for the Icelandic clubs BÍ and FH, the English club Colchester United and the Norwegian club Start.

Career

Early career
Matthías was born in Reykjavík and grew up in Ísafjörður where he played with BÍ until he was 17 years old. He moved to Hafnarfjörður in 2004 to play with FH where he enjoyed early success with the youth teams of FH, winning the cup in 2004 and also the double in 2005, which is the only group in the club who have won the double. Matthías made his first-team debut for FH at the age of 18 in the last match of the 2005 season. He came on as a substitute with 20 minutes were left in the game, after one minute he was awarded a penalty which the team's top goalscorer Tryggvi Guðmundsson converted to complete his hattrick.

Between 2006 and 2010, Matthías won five titles with his team, three league titles and two cups. In 2007, he was voted the best young player in the league by other players. The 2009 season also ended with a league title, and he had most assists in the league and was the player with sixth most goals despite playing as a midfielder or right back. In the spring of 2010 he became one of the youngest captains in the history of FH when he was selected as the club captain for the 2010 season by his manager Heimir Guðjónsson. The same season, Matthías was voted the best midfielder in the league by other players in a survey by the most popular football website in Iceland, www.fotbolti.net. The highlight of the season was when FH won the cup 4–0 against their rivals KR where Matthías scored first two goals from the penalty spot before lifting the trophy after the game.

England
Matthías joined Colchester United on trial in November 2010. He impressed the manager John Ward enough to earn a loan deal to the end of the season with the option of a permanent deal. Matthías made his début as an 83rd-minute substitute in a 2–0 defeat against Brighton & Hove Albion where he replaced Dave Mooney.

Norway
Ahead of the 2012-season, Matthías joined Norwegian First Division club Start on a season-long loan-deal. He scored 18 goals for the team during the season, and became the top goalscorer in the 2012 Norwegian First Division when Start won promotion to Tippeligaen. Ahead of the 2012-season he joined Start on a permanent deal, and signed a two-year contract with the club.

On 25 July 2015, after weeks of speculations, Matthías signed for the Norwegian club Rosenborg on a two-and-a-half-year deal.

Career statistics

Club

International goals
Scores and results list Iceland's goal tally first.

Honours
FH
Icelandic League (3): 2006, 2008, 2009 
Icelandic Cup (2): 2007, 2010 
Icelandic League Cup (3) 2006, 2007, 2009
Icelandic Super Cup (3) 2007, 2008, 2010

Rosenborg
Norwegian League (4): 2015, 2016, 2017, 2018
Norwegian Football Cup (3): 2015, 2016, 2018  
Mesterfinalen (1): 2017

Individual
Norwegian Cup Top goalscorer: 2017

References

External links
 
 
 

1987 births
Living people
Matthias Vilhjalmsson
Matthias Vilhjalmsson
Association football forwards
Matthias Vilhjalmsson
Matthias Vilhjalmsson
Matthias Vilhjalmsson
Matthias Vilhjalmsson
Matthias Vilhjalmsson
Colchester United F.C. players
IK Start players
Rosenborg BK players
Vålerenga Fotball players
Matthias Vilhjalmsson
English Football League players
Norwegian First Division players
Eliteserien players
Matthias Vilhjalmsson
Matthias Vilhjalmsson
Matthias Vilhjalmsson
Expatriate footballers in England
Expatriate footballers in Norway